Bayda (Arabic: بيداء) is a desert between Mecca and Medina in the Hejaz region. The desert is without water/grass and its distance to Masjid-u-Shajarah is two kilometers towards to the city of Mecca.

According to Islamic narration(s), Khasf al Bayda or swallowing (of the army of Sufyani) in the land of Bayda is among the signs of the appearance of Mahdi.

Etymology 
The name of this locality was narrated at the "hadith of Khasf-e-Bayda" (swallowing in Bayda land) by such name. Both of Shia and Sunni Islam sources have mentioned about the event of "swallowing in the territory of Bayda" as one of the signs of the appearance of Mahdi; based on Islamic hadiths.

Bayda means a desert without water and grass, and as an expression it is the name of a vast desert that is located to the 9 kilometer to the southwest of Medina and after Dhu al-Halifa; it likewise has been divided in two southern and northern parts through the way of Medina to Jeddah and Mecca.

Islamic eschatology 
Regarding the Khasf al-Bayda, there is a hadith from Muhammad bin 'Ali bin al-Husayn (Muhamad al-Baqir) that says: at Akhar-al-Zaman (End of Time), at the time when the army of Sufyani enters the territory of Bayda, a caller calls: Oh plain, annihilate that nation (of Sufyani army); subsequently the Earth swallows them, and all of them will be swallowed except 3 individuals.

Prayer 
Based on Feqhi sources: saying prayers is Makruh (i.e.: not haram but better not to do) in this desert (of Bayda) and the Divine torment will be come down at this locality.

See also 
 Seyyed Hassani
 Khasf al-Bayda
 The Occultation
 Seyed Khorasani
 Al-Yamani (Shiism)
 The voice from sky
 The Fourteen Infallibles
 Nafs-e-Zakiyyah (Pure soul)
 Signs of the reappearance of al-Mahdi

References 

Islamic eschatology
Islamic terminology
Hejaz
Mahdism